China Aviation Industry Corporation  I (AVIC I) was a Chinese consortium of aircraft manufacturers. The consortium was created on 1 July 1999 by splitting the state-owned consortium Aviation Industry Corporation of China (AVIC) into AVIC I and AVIC II. AVIC I was historically focused on large planes such as bombers (Xian H-6, Xian JH-7), medium commercial planes (ARJ21), or fighter planes (J-7, J-8, J-10, J-11 and JF-17), while AVIC II was focused on smaller planes and helicopters. On 28 October 2008, the companies officially consolidated back into one organization to more efficiently manage resources and avoid redundant projects.

Subsidiaries
 Chengdu Aircraft Industry Group
 Guizhou Aircraft Industry Co.
 Shanghai Aviation Industrial Company
 Shenyang Aircraft Corporation
 Xi'an Aircraft Industrial Corporation

Other Units
 ACAC consortium
 Comac

See also
 China Aviation Industry Corporation
 China Aerospace Science and Technology Corporation
 People's Liberation Army Air Force
 China Aviation Industry Corporation II (AVIC II) 
 Commission of Science, Technology and Industry for National Defense
 China Northern Industries
 China Shipbuilding Industry Corporation
 China State Shipbuilding Corporation
 List of Chinese aircraft
 List of Chinese aircraft engines

External links
https://web.archive.org/web/20090917104138/http://www.avic1.com.cn/

Aircraft manufacturers of China
Defence companies of the People's Republic of China
Holding companies established in 1999
Chinese companies established in 1999
Defunct government-owned companies of China
1999 establishments in China